Simon Richard Evans (born December 1983) is an English theatre and television director, writer, and actor. He is best known as co-creator, writer, and producer of Staged (2020–2022), in which he also co-stars as a fictionalised version of himself, which premiered on BBC One.

Early life
Evans was raised in Oxford with his sister, actress Lucy Eaton, while his parents ran a dental practice in nearby Kidlington. He was educated at The Dragon School and Abingdon School, where his fellow alumni include Tom Hollander, Toby Jones, Hugh Langford and members of Radiohead. He studied Education, English, Drama & the Arts at Homerton College, Cambridge.

Career
As a theatre director, Evans' productions include The Dazzle (starring Andrew Scott), Bug (James Norton), The Resistible Rise of Arturo Ui (Lenny Henry), Killer Joe (Orlando Bloom) and A Day in the Death of Joe Egg (Toby Stephens and Claire Skinner).

As an actor, Evans' early roles include parts in Stig of the Dump (2002) and Lewis (2007).

Working with Secret Cinema, Simon directed immersive productions of Shawshank Redemption and Millers Crossing.

During the COVID-19 pandemic, Evans wrote, directed and co-starred in the BBC Television series Staged, playing himself, alongside exaggerated versions of the show's stars, Michael Sheen and David Tennant. The series was notable for being made using video conferencing technology. Evans had been due to rehearse Tom Stoppard's The Real Thing at Chichester when lockdown came into effect. His cinematic directorial debut, Hunter in the Dark, was also postponed.

Following Staged, Evans hosted and directed another lockdown event, a live-streamed Oxford Playhouse fundraiser, A Theatre Near You, starring Stephen Fry, Marcus Brigstocke, and Lucy Porter.

Evans is the founding director of the theatre company, Myriad Entertainment, along with Georgia Clarke-Day and David Frias Robles.

Personal life
As of 2020, he lives in Noke, Oxfordshire.

Filmography

References

External links 
 
 

Living people
1983 births
English television writers
English television actors
English television directors
English theatre directors
People from Oxford
People educated at The Dragon School